Mark E. Dean (born March 2, 1957) is an American inventor and computer engineer. He developed the ISA bus, and he led a design team for making a one-gigahertz computer processor chip. He holds three of nine PC patents for being the co-creator of the IBM personal computer released in 1981. In 1995, Dean was named the first ever African-American IBM Fellow.

Dean was elected as a member into the National Academy of Engineering in 2001 for innovative and pioneering contributions to personal computer development.

In August 2011, writing in his blog, Dean stated that he now uses a tablet computer instead of a PC.

Early life 

Dean was born in Jefferson City, Tennessee. Dean displayed an affinity for technology and invention at a young age. When Mark was young, he and his dad constructed a tractor from scratch. Dean attended Jefferson City High School in Tennessee, where he excelled in both academics and athletics.

Recognition 
Dean is the first African-American to become an IBM Fellow, which is the highest level of technical excellence at the company. In 1997, he was inducted into the National Inventors Hall of Fame. He was elected to the National Academy of Engineering in 2001.

Career 
Dean was the interim dean of the UT's Tickle College of Engineering from August 2018 to July 2019 and is the John Fisher Distinguished Professor in the Department of Electrical Engineering and Computer Science at the University of Tennessee. He was previously CTO for IBM Middle East and Africa and was an IBM Vice President overseeing the company's Almaden Research Center in San Jose, California prior to that. Dean now holds more than 20 patents, Dean was part of the team that developed the industry standard architecture (ISA) systems bus that enables multiple devices, such as modems and printers, to be connected to personal computers. And his work led to development of the color PC monitor.

As of April 26, 2019, April 25 is now officially Mark Dean Day in Knox County, Tennessee.

References

External links 

1957 births
Living people
People from Jefferson City, Tennessee
African-American engineers
21st-century American engineers
African-American inventors
20th-century American inventors
African-American computer scientists
American computer scientists
IBM Fellows
Members of the United States National Academy of Engineering
Computer hardware engineers
Harvard University faculty
University of Tennessee faculty
University of Tennessee alumni
Florida Atlantic University alumni
Stanford University School of Engineering alumni
21st-century African-American people
20th-century African-American people
Inventors from Tennessee